Antaeotricha excisa is a species of moth of the family Depressariidae. It is found in the Guianas and Brazil.

The wingspan is 18–20 mm. The forewings are white with a violet-grey basal patch suffusedly spotted with dark fuscous occupying one-fourth of the wing, the edge slightly oblique and with two small cloudy fuscous spots on the dorsum towards the middle. There is a black dot on the lower angle of the cell, and a fuscous one on the upper, as well as a curved series of several small indistinct fuscous marks running from the costa beyond the middle to the dorsum before the tornus and a somewhat sinuate indistinct fuscous shade from five-sixths of the costa to the tornus. A cloudy dark fuscous spot is found on the apex and upper part of the termen. The hindwings are ochreous-grey-whitish with the costa expanded from the base to two-thirds and with a broad projection of long rough hairscales suffused with grey beneath, and a long whitish subcostal hairpencil lying in an ochreous groove from the base concealed beneath the forewings.

References

Moths described in 1916
excisa
Taxa named by Edward Meyrick
Moths of South America